Acheroxenylla is a genus of springtails in the family Hypogastruridae. There are at least three described species in Acheroxenylla.

Species
These three species belong to the genus Acheroxenylla:
 Acheroxenylla canariensis Fjellberg, 1992 i c g
 Acheroxenylla cretensis Ellis, 1976 i c g
 Acheroxenylla furcata Fjellberg, 1992 i c g
Data sources: i = ITIS, c = Catalogue of Life, g = GBIF, b = Bugguide.net

References

Further reading

 
 
 

Collembola
Springtail genera